Dušan Đorđević (also transliterated Dušan Djordjević; born 25 June 1996) is a Serbian footballer who plays as a defender for Železničar Pančevo.

Club career
Coming from the youth school of Borac Čačak, Đorđević also started his senior career with the club. He joined the first team during the spring half of 2013–14 Serbian First League season. After Borac made promotion in the Serbian SuperLiga, Đorđević trained with the first team, but stayed with youth team until the end of 2014–15 season. After the end of his youth career, he  was loaned to Polet Ljubić on dual registration for the 2015–16 season. Đorđević made his Serbian SuperLiga debut in last fixture of the 2015–16 season, played on 21 May 2015. Later, in early 2017, Đorđević also extended his loan at Polet Ljubić, where he spent the whole year. At the beginning of 2018, six months before the end of contract with the club, Đorđević mutually terminated the contract with Borac and left the club as a free agent.

At the beginning of 2018, Đorđević joined Morava Zone League side Sloga Kraljevo. In summer same year, he moved to Železničar Pančevo.

Career statistics

Personal life
Originating from Obilić, Đorđević was born in Priština, moving to the Central Serbia with family as a kid, during the Kosovo War. He grew up in Tavnik, a village between Kraljevo and Čačak, where he started playing football. In autumn 2016, Đorđević broke his football career to be a novice at the Zočište Monastery.

References

External links
 
 
 
 

1996 births
Living people
Sportspeople from Pristina
Association football defenders
Serbian footballers
FK Borac Čačak players
FK Polet Ljubić players
FK Sloga Kraljevo players
FK Železničar Pančevo players
Serbian SuperLiga players